Adrià Carmona Pérez (born 8 February 1992) is a Spanish professional footballer who plays as a left winger or attacking midfielder for CE L'Hospitalet.

Club career
Born in Igualada, Barcelona, Catalonia, Carmona arrived at FC Barcelona's youth system at the age of nine. In 2010, he moved to Italian side A.C. Milan to complete his formation.

Carmona only appeared for the Rossoneri reserves during his early spell. On 31 January 2013, he was loaned to Real Zaragoza in La Liga, until the end of the season.

Carmona made his debut as a professional on 16 February 2013, playing 26 minutes in a 0–1 away loss against CA Osasuna after coming on as a substitute for veteran José María Movilla. On 1 August, he signed for Girona FC also of the second tier.

On 30 June 2014, after being sparingly used, Carmona joined RCD Espanyol B from Segunda División B. On 8 July of the following year, he moved to second division team Albacete Balompié.

Carmona scored his first professional goal on 6 February 2016, in a 2–2 home draw against Real Oviedo. On 21 July, after Alba's relegation, he signed a two-year contract with fellow league club CD Lugo.

On 31 August 2018, Carmona joined Delhi Dynamos FC. He scored his first goal in the Indian Super League on 4 November, in a 2–2 home draw to Jamshedpur FC.

Club statistics

Honours
Spain U17
UEFA European Under-17 Championship: 2008
FIFA U-17 World Cup: Third place 2009

References

External links

1992 births
Living people
People from Igualada
Sportspeople from the Province of Barcelona
Spanish footballers
Footballers from Catalonia
Association football midfielders
Association football wingers
A.C. Milan players
La Liga players
Segunda División players
Segunda División B players
Real Zaragoza players
Girona FC players
RCD Espanyol B footballers
Albacete Balompié players
CD Lugo players
CE L'Hospitalet players
Indian Super League players
Odisha FC players
Spain youth international footballers
Spanish expatriate footballers
Expatriate footballers in Italy
Expatriate footballers in India
Spanish expatriate sportspeople in Italy
Spanish expatriate sportspeople in India